Lester Gaba (1907 – 12 August 1987) was an American sculptor, writer and retail display designer.

Early life 

Gaba was born in Hannibal, Missouri. His parents owned a general store, but Gaba took no interest in the shop, spending most of the time on his own, drawing. At the age of 10, he participated at a soap sculpture contest organised by Procter & Gamble. Although he did not win it, participating changed his life. He decided he would become a proficient soap sculptor. He went to art school in Chicago, where he spent a lot of time in Lake View, where Chicago's homosexual population congregated.

He found his first job at Balaban & Katz theater corporation, where he made posters.  Since the art director of the company was entranced by the soap figurines Gaba made, they were readily used for magazine covers and the like. Advertising agencies seized on the technique and soon Gaba's soap carvings were adorning magazine covers as well as being marketed as a children's soap. Mr. Gaba was also the only person to make a living from sculpting soap. He published several books on the sculpting of soap in his time. https://www.findagrave.com/memorial/40099804/a_-lester-gaba

New York career 

By 1932 Gaba had moved to New York, where he designed a lifelike mannequin known as Cynthia that was created for Saks Fifth Avenue. Cynthia was a 100-pound model who had realistic imperfections like freckles, pigeon toes, and even different sized feet. Gaba posed with Cynthia around New York City for a Life Magazine shoot that humorously demonstrates how lifelike the mannequins had become. Cartier and Tiffany sent her jewelry, Lilly Daché designed hats for her, and couturiers sent her their latest fashions, furrieries sent minks. Soon a whole host of ‘Gaba Girls’ followed.

The Gaba Girls were life-sized, carved-soap mannequins modeled after well-known New York debutantes for the windows of Best & Co. They reduced the weight of a New York store mannequin from 200 to around 30 pounds, and with the Gaba Girls and their realistic successors’ appeal, mannequins became a popular new tool for sellers to attract their clientele.

During his first years in New York, it is claimed but unverified that Gaba had a relationship with Vincente Minnelli. When Minnelli left for Hollywood, Gaba seems to have remained aloof, and unencumbered for the remainder of his life.

In cooperation with the National Soap Sculpture Committee, he wrote a book on the technique of Soap Carving called  .

Meanwhile, Cynthia's fame grew and grew. She was given a credit card from Saks Fifth Avenue, a box seat subscription to the Metropolitan Opera House and even made the cover of Life Magazine. Cynthia also had her own newspaper column, and a successful radio show. Cynthia went to Hollywood to appear in Artists and Models Abroad (1938) with Jack Benny. She received huge amounts of fan mail. Cynthia was photographed by Alfred Eisenstaedt. Cynthia went to the Broadhurst Theater in New York, to see the notorious play 'Madame Bovary', in 1939. Gaba insisted that Cynthia had laryngitis, to account for her lack of speech. Gaba, reminded pesky writers that Cynthia was a lady, and therefore a good listener. But the beautiful Cynthia met her demise when she slipped from a chair in a beauty salon, and shattered into a thousand pieces. The press reported her death, and Gaba appeared distraught, but since Cynthia's mold was very much intact, she was to live again.

Gaba in addition to his soap sculptures and mannequin designs became an accomplished jewelry designer. His work for Coro Jewelry consisted of higher end costume and was very “Americana”.

After the war 

From 1941 to 1967, Mr. Gaba contributed the weekly column "Lester Gaba Looks at Display" to Women's Wear Daily, commenting on aspects and trends of window display design as marketing for retail clothing.  In the 1940s and 1950s, Gaba began staging elaborate and theatrical fashion shows for the Coty Awards, the March of Dimes, and for fashion trade groups; the creative shows involved various highlights, such as marionettes, and/or and props such as the Hope Diamond and the Star of the East.

In December 1942, Gaba was inducted into the army. Cynthia was retired, and it wasn't until 1953 that she came back to appear in public on a TV show. But the magic was over, and Cynthia was soon retired for good, but Lester Gaba continued to do retail fashion display work.

In retirement, Gaba was asked to teach at the Laboratory Institute of Merchandising, now LIM College. He became a noted academic on visual merchandising, and taught for several years. Gaba later owned a home on Fire Island where he vacationed. In his later years he became noted for his still-life painting.

Gaba wrote the seminal text "The Art Of Window Display" in 1952, one of the first serious books on the topic in the marketplace.

Lester Gaba was 80 years old, and lived in Manhattan. He died of cancer of the colon at Beekman Downtown Hospital. There were no surviving relations.

Legacy and links

Lester Gaba was a hybrid artist whose influence on modern art is underestimated. He reinvented the store mannequin and revolutionised window dressing. Years before Andy Warhol and Roy Liechtenstein, he already displayed giant dotted images. His public appearances with Cynthia make him a pioneer of performance art.

Comic Strip artist Wyeth Yates created a comic novel about Lester Gaba.

References

External links 
 "Gabbing over Gaba". by Leeander Scott
 "Soap Carving, Cinderella of sculpture" by Lester Gaba
 "Lester Gaba: From Soap to Mannequins" by Janet Mabie
 "". by Wyeth Yates and Josh Trujillo

People from Hannibal, Missouri
1907 births
1987 deaths
20th-century American sculptors
20th-century American male artists
American male sculptors
Deaths from colorectal cancer
American jewelry designers